Stadt is a district in the Swiss city of Winterthur. It is district number 1, thus mainly comprising the original city.

The district comprises the quarters Altstadt, Lind, Heiligberg, Tössfeld, Brühlberg and Neuwiesen.

References

Winterthur